Gunjaci is the name of two areas:
Gunjaci, a region in Bosnia-Herzegovina located in the municipality of Milići, Republika Srpska ;
Gunjaci, an area of Serbia located in the municipality of Osečina, Kolubara.